In mathematics, Gregory's series for the inverse tangent function is its infinite Taylor series expansion at the origin:

It was first discovered in the 14th century by Madhava of Sangamagrama (c. 1340 – c. 1425), as credited by Madhava's Kerala school follower Jyeṣṭhadeva's Yuktibhāṣā (c. 1530). In recent literature it is sometimes called the Madhava–Gregory series to recognize Madhava's priority (see also Madhava series).

Proof 

If  then  The derivative is

Taking the reciprocal,

This sometimes is used as a definition of the arctangent:

While this turns out correctly, integrals and infinite sums cannot always be exchanged in this manner. To prove that the integral on the left converges to the sum on the right for real   can instead be written as the finite sum,

Again integrating both sides, 

In the limit as  the integral on the right above tends to zero when  because

Therefore,

Convergence 

They diverge for  because when , there is a pole:

When  the partial sums  alternate between the values  and  never converging to the value 

Because of its exceedingly slow convergence (it takes five billion terms to obtain 10 correct decimal digits), the Leibniz formula is not a very effective practical method for computing  Finding ways to get around this slow convergence has been a subject of great mathematical interest.

History 
The earliest person to whom the series can be attributed with confidence is Madhava of Sangamagrama (c. 1340 – c. 1425). The original reference (as with much of Madhava's work) is lost, but he is credited with the discovery by several of his successors in the Kerala school of astronomy and mathematics founded by him. Specific citations to the series for  include Nilakantha Somayaji's Tantrasangraha (c. 1500), 
Jyeṣṭhadeva's Yuktibhāṣā (c. 1530), and the Yukti-dipika commentary by Sankara Variyar, where it is given in verses 2.206 – 2.209.

See also
 List of mathematical series
 Madhava series

Notes

References 
 
 
 
 

Mathematical series